Hanne Marie is a traditional sailing vessel with a gaff ketch rig that was built in Fanø Denmark in 1919. The ship originally functioned as a fishing vessel, but was decommissioned in Esbjerg in the 1970s. After being renovated between 1980 and 1990 Hanne Marie was transferred to Bielefeld, Germany and an association was created to maintain and sail the boat.
Since 2004 the home port of Hanne Marie is Greifswald, Germany. There it is managed as a traditional ship by a small sailing collective called 'Hanne Marie Segeln e.V.'. Sailing trips start from the museum port in Greifswald and the excursions generally take place in the southern and western Baltic Sea. The goal of the collective is to preserve the art of traditional sailing.

Ship facts

See also
Greif (also based from Greifswald)

References

External links
 Hanne Marie (official website) 

Sailing ships
Greifswald
1919 ships